"Hilli (At The Top Of The World)" is the second single from the album Kurr released by Icelandic band Amiina. The song features American musician Lee Hazlewood in his last recording and collaboration. The vocal parts consist of Lee telling a story accompanied by a reworked version of the song "Hilli" whose original version is available on Kurr.

The story has a strong environmental message.  It starts by setting the scene of the simple life of the people from the top of the world (a "magical island") whose spirit is found by the snow laden world they live in.  It conjures up an idyllic scene of children catching snowflakes - "they fall like candy....they open their mouths and gulp down the flakes, 'cos nothing on earth tastes so sweet."  Then, the story turns darker as on the horizon the people see fire "and the water did rise and the snow started melting away."  The fire represents man's environmental damage.  The snow started to melt and spread throughout the world as light, running upstream and bursting through fountains and springs.  At first the people around the world were not shocked by what they saw, not understanding what had caused it...."even their teachers did not know what the bright light was for." All were initially touched by this light, but as they "looked all around" and up at the sky, they "realised the damage they had done."  It ends with penance: "as they started to cry, their tears filled the sky as the dark clouds formed above.  And then the heavens opened and the rains came to show them, that the world needs a little more love."

Before the single was released it was rumored that a cover version of Lee's song "Leather and Lace" would be the single's second track, but this turned out to be just a rumor.

The song was featured on the Aled Jones Sunday morning show on BBC's Radio Two in 2008, and made such an impact it was repeated the following week at the request of many listeners.

Track listing 
CD Promo
 "Hilli (At The Top Of The World)" - 3:21
 "Hilli" (album version) - 3:09

7"
 "Hilli (At The Top Of The World)" - 3:21
 "Leather & Lace" - 4:03

References

External links 
 Interview with Sólrún about the song in Swedish TV.

2007 singles
2007 songs